Clyde Jackson Browne (born October 9, 1948) is an American musician, singer, songwriter, and political activist who has sold over 18 million records in the United States.

Emerging as a precocious teenage songwriter in mid-1960s Los Angeles, he experienced his first successes writing songs for others, writing "These Days" as a 16-year-old; the song became a minor hit for the German singer and Andy Warhol protégé Nico in 1967. He also wrote several songs for fellow Southern California bands the Nitty Gritty Dirt Band, which he was briefly a member in 1966, and the Eagles, the latter of whom had their first US Billboard Top 40 hit in 1972 with the Browne co-written song "Take It Easy".

Encouraged by his successes writing songs for others, Browne released his self-titled debut album in 1972, which spawned two Top 40 hits of his own, "Doctor, My Eyes" and "Rock Me on the Water". For his debut album, as well as for the next several albums and concert tours, Browne started working closely with the Section, a prolific session band that also worked with a variety of other prominent singer-songwriters at the time. His second album, For Everyman, was released in 1973, and while it lacked an enduring single, has been retrospectively assessed as some of his best work, appearing highly on several "Best Album of All Time" lists. His third album, Late for the Sky, was his most successful to that point, peaking at number 14 on the US Billboard 200 album chart. His fourth album, The Pretender, continued the pattern of each album topping the previous by peaking at number 5 on the album chart, and spawned the hit singles "Here Come Those Tears Again" and "The Pretender".

It would be the 1977 album Running on Empty, however, that would become his signature work, peaking at number 3 on the album chart, and remaining there for over a year. Both a live album and a concept album, the songs on the album explore the themes of life as a touring musician, and the album was recorded both on stage, and in places touring musicians spend time when not playing, such as hotel rooms, backstage, and in one case on a moving tour bus. The album produced two Top 40 singles, "Running on Empty" and "The Load-Out/Stay", and many of the other tracks became popular radio hits on the AOR format.

Successful albums continued through the 1980s, including the 1980 album Hold Out, his only number 1 album, the non-album single "Somebody's Baby", which was used in the film Fast Times at Ridgemont High, and 1983's Lawyers in Love, which included the hit single "Tender Is the Night". In 1986, he released Lives in the Balance, which had several radio hits and included the introspective "In the Shape of a Heart", which was inspired by the suicide of his first wife a decade prior. His string of hit albums came to an end at that point, as his next several albums failed to produce a gold or platinum RIAA rating.

He released two compilation albums, The Next Voice You Hear: The Best of Jackson Browne in 1997, and The Very Best of Jackson Browne, released in conjunction with his Rock and Roll Hall of Fame induction in 2004. His most recent studio album is 2021's Downhill from Everywhere, the follow-up to 2014's Standing in the Breach, which included the first fully realized version of his song "The Birds of St. Marks", a song he had written at age 18. In 2015, Rolling Stone ranked him as 37th in its list of the "100 Greatest Songwriters of All Time".

Biography

Early life
Browne was born October 9, 1948, in Heidelberg, Germany, where his father Clyde Jack Browne, an American serviceman, was stationed for his job assignment with the Stars and Stripes newspaper. Browne's mother, Beatrice Amanda (née Dahl), was a Minnesota native of Norwegian ancestry. 

Browne has three siblings: Roberta "Berbie" Browne, born in 1946 in Nuremberg, Germany; Edward Severin Browne, born in 1949 in Frankfurt, Germany; and his younger sister, Gracie Browne, born a number of years later. 

At the age of three, Browne and his family moved to his grandfather's house, Abbey San Encino, in the Highland Park district of Los Angeles. In his teens, he began singing folk songs in local venues such as the Ash Grove and The Troubadour Club. He attended Sunny Hills High School in Fullerton, California, graduating in 1966.

Songwriter for others
After graduating in 1966, Browne joined the Nitty Gritty Dirt Band, performing at the Golden Bear (Huntington Beach, California) where they opened for the Lovin' Spoonful. The band later recorded a number of Browne's songs, including "These Days", "Holding", and "Shadow Dream Song". He also spent a short time in his friend Pamela Polland's band, Gentle Soul. Browne left the Dirt Band after a few months and moved to Greenwich Village, New York, where he became a staff writer for Elektra Records' publishing company, Nina Music, before his eighteenth birthday. He reported on musical events in New York City with his friends Greg Copeland and Adam Saylor. He spent the remainder of 1967 and 1968 in Greenwich Village, where he backed Tim Buckley and singer Nico of the Velvet Underground. In 1967, Browne and Nico were romantically linked and he became a significant contributor to her debut album, Chelsea Girl, writing and playing guitar on several of the songs (including "These Days"). In 1968, following his breakup with Nico, Browne returned to Los Angeles, where he formed a folk band with Ned Doheny and Jack Wilce, and first met Glenn Frey.

Browne's first songs, such as "Shadow Dream Song" and "These Days", were recorded by the Nitty Gritty Dirt Band, Tom Rush, Nico, Steve Noonan, Gregg Allman, Joan Baez, the Eagles, Linda Ronstadt, the Byrds, Iain Matthews, and others. Browne did not release his own versions of these early songs until years later. Soon after this, Rolling Stone mentioned Browne as a "new face to look for" and praised his "mind-boggling melodies".

Classic period

In 1971, Browne signed with his manager David Geffen's Asylum Records and released Jackson Browne (1972) produced and engineered by Richard Orshoff, which included the piano-driven "Doctor My Eyes", which entered the Top Ten in the US singles chart. "Rock Me on the Water", from the same album, also gained considerable radio airplay, while "Jamaica Say You Will" and "Song for Adam" (written about his friend Adam Saylor's death) helped establish Browne's reputation. Touring to promote the album, he shared the bill with Linda Ronstadt and Joni Mitchell.

His next album, For Everyman (1973)—while considered of high quality—was less successful than his debut album, although it still sold a million copies. The upbeat "Take It Easy", cowritten with Eagles' Glenn Frey, had already been a major success for that group, while his own recording of "These Days" reflected a sound representing Browne's angst.

Late for the Sky (1974) consolidated Browne's fan base, and the album peaked at No. 14 on the Billboard album chart, the 84th-best-selling album of 1974. Browne's work began to demonstrate a reputation for memorable melody, insightful, often very personal lyrics, and a talent for his arrangements in composition.
It featured a Magritte-inspired cover. Highlights included the title song, the elegiac "For a Dancer", "Before the Deluge", and "Fountain of Sorrow". The arrangements featured the violin and guitar of David Lindley, Jai Winding's piano, and the harmonies of Rosemary Butler and Doug Haywood. The title track was also featured in Martin Scorsese's film Taxi Driver. During this period, Browne began his fractious but lifelong professional relationship with singer-songwriter Warren Zevon, mentoring Zevon's first two Asylum albums through the studio as a producer (working closely with Waddy Wachtel and Jorge Calderón).

When touring in 1975, Browne was accompanied by his wife Phyllis and one-year-old son Ethan. Browne also added keyboardist Wayne Cook to the tour. They toured in a converted Greyhound Bus. In the autumn of 1975, Browne performed shows with the Eagles, Linda Ronstadt, and Toots and the Maytals.

Browne's character was even more apparent in his next album, The Pretender. It was released during 1976, after the suicide of his first wife, Phyllis Major, and features production by Jon Landau and a mixture of styles, ranging from the mariachi-inspired "Linda Paloma" to the country-driven "Your Bright Baby Blues" and the downbeat "Sleep's Dark and Silent Gate".

A year after the untimely death of Major, "Here Come Those Tears Again"—which he co-wrote with Nancy Farnsworth, the mother of his deceased wife—peaked at No. 23 on the Hot 100.

Running on Empty (1977), recorded entirely on tour, became his biggest commercial success. Breaking the usual conventions for a live album, Browne used only new material and combined live concert performances with recordings made on buses, in hotel rooms, and back stage. Running on Empty contains some of his most popular songs, such as the title track, "Rosie", and "The Load-Out/Stay", Browne's send-off to his concert audiences and tribute to his roadies.

Activism and music
In spring of 1978, Browne appeared at the site of the Barnwell, South Carolina, nuclear reprocessing plant to perform a free concert the night before a civil disobedience action; he did not participate in the action. In June 1978 he performed on the grounds of the Seabrook Station Nuclear Power Plant construction site in New Hampshire for 20,000 opponents of the reactor.

Soon after the Three Mile Island nuclear accident, during March 1979, Browne joined with several musician friends to found the antinuclear organization Musicians United for Safe Energy. He was arrested protesting against the Diablo Canyon Power Plant near San Luis Obispo. His next album, Hold Out (1980), was commercially successful and his only number 1 record on the U.S. pop albums chart. The album generated "Boulevard". In 1982, he released the single "Somebody's Baby" from the Fast Times at Ridgemont High soundtrack, which became his biggest hit, peaking at number 7 on the Billboard Hot 100. The 1983 Lawyers in Love followed, signaling a discernible change from the personal to the political in his lyrics. In 1985, he sang a duet with Clarence Clemons in a song called "You're a Friend of Mine".

Political protest came to the fore in Browne's music in the 1986 album, Lives in the Balance, an explicit condemnation of U.S. policy in Central America. Flavored with new instrumental textures, it was a huge success with many Browne fans, though not with mainstream audiences. The title track, "Lives in the Balance", with its Andean pan pipes—and lines like, "There's a shadow on the faces / Of the men who fan the flames / Of the wars that are fought in places / Where we can't even say the names"—was an outcry against U.S.-backed wars in Nicaragua, El Salvador, and Guatemala. The song was used at several points in the award-winning 1987 PBS documentary, The Secret Government: The Constitution in Crisis, by journalist Bill Moyers, and was part of the soundtrack of Stone's War, a 1986 Miami Vice episode focusing on American involvement in Central America.

During the 1980s, Browne performed frequently at benefit concerts for causes he supported, including Farm Aid, Amnesty International (making several appearances on the 1986 A Conspiracy of Hope tour), post-Somoza revolutionary Nicaragua, and the Christic Institute. The album World in Motion, released in 1989, contains a cover of Steven Van Zandt's "I am a Patriot", a song which he has performed at numerous concerts.

Browne also performed alongside Roy Orbison in A Black and White Night in 1988 along with Bruce Springsteen, k.d. lang, and many others. The special originally aired on Cinemax.

1990s

Browne wrote and recorded the song "The Rebel Jesus" with the Chieftains, which appeared on their 1991 Christmas album The Bells of Dublin. In 1993, four years after his previous album, Browne returned with I'm Alive, a critically acclaimed album with a more personal style that did not have any successful singles but still sold respectably—indeed, the ninth track from the album, "Sky Blue and Black", was used during the pilot episode of the sitcom Friends. In 1994, Browne collaborated with Kathy Mattea to contribute "Rock Me on the Water" to the AIDS benefit album Red Hot + Country produced by the Red Hot Organization.

During 1995, he performed in The Wizard of Oz in Concert: Dreams Come True, a musical performance of the popular story at Lincoln Center to benefit the Children's Defense Fund. The performance was originally broadcast on Turner Network Television, and issued on CD and video in 1996. He sang a duet with Jann Arden, "Unloved", on her 1995 album Living Under June. Browne's own album, Looking East (1996), was released soon after, but was not as successful commercially.

2000–present
Browne released his first album in six years, The Naked Ride Home in 2002, with a performance on Austin City Limits, featuring the recording with older familiar songs.

During 2003, Browne guest-starred as himself in The Simpsons episode "Brake My Wife, Please", performing a parody of his song "Rosie" with lyrics altered to reference the plot involving Homer and Marge.

In 2004, Browne was inducted into the Rock and Roll Hall of Fame. Bruce Springsteen gave the induction speech, commenting to Browne that although the Eagles were inducted first, he said, "You wrote the songs they wished they had written". Browne had written quite a few hit songs that many artists, including the Eagles, had recorded over the span of his career. The previous year, three of Browne's albums—For Everyman, Late for the Sky, and The Pretender—had been selected by Rolling Stone magazine as among its choices for the 500 best albums of all time.

A liberal Democrat, Browne appeared in several rallies for presidential candidate Ralph Nader in 2000, singing "I Am a Patriot" and other songs. He participated in the Vote for Change tour during October 2004, playing a series of concerts in American swing states. These concerts were organized by MoveOn.org to mobilize people to vote for John Kerry in the presidential election. Browne appeared with Bonnie Raitt and Keb' Mo', and once with Bruce Springsteen. During late 2006, Browne performed with Michael Stanley and J. D. Souther at a fundraiser for Democratic candidates in Ohio. For the 2008 presidential election, he endorsed John Edwards for the Democratic presidential nomination and performed at some of Edwards' appearances. After Barack Obama won the Democratic nomination, Browne endorsed him. Browne also performed briefly at the Occupy Wall Street presence at Zuccotti Park in Lower Manhattan on December 1, 2011, to show his support for their cause. In the 2016 Democratic Party presidential primaries, Browne endorsed United States senator Bernie Sanders of Vermont.

Solo Acoustic, Vol. 1, was released in 2005 on Inside Recordings. The album consists of live recordings of 11 previously released tracks including "The Birds of St. Marks", a song written in 1967, that appears on his 2014 album, Standing in the Breach. Solo Acoustic, Vol. 1 was nominated for a Grammy Award in 2007 in the category of Best Contemporary Folk/Americana Album. A live follow-up album, Solo Acoustic, Vol. 2, was released on March 4, 2008.

Browne is part of the No Nukes group which is against the expansion of nuclear power. During 2007, the group recorded a music video of a new version of the Buffalo Springfield song "For What It's Worth".

Browne made a cameo appearance in the 2007 film, Walk Hard: The Dewey Cox Story.

Browne's thirteenth studio album, Time the Conqueror, was released September 23, 2008, by Inside Recordings. The album reached the Billboard 200 album chart at No. 20, which was his first top-20 record since releasing Lawyers in Love in 1983. In addition, the album peaked at No. 2 on the Billboard Independent Album chart.

During August 2008, Browne sued John McCain, the Ohio Republican Party, and the Republican National Committee for using his 1977 hit, "Running on Empty", in an attack advertisement against Barack Obama without his permission. In July 2009, the matter was settled under an undisclosed financial agreement with an apology from the McCain campaign and other parties.

During August 2008, he appeared on the ALMA Awards in a taped interview honoring Trailblazer Award recipient and long-time friend, Linda Ronstadt.

On May 31, 2008, Browne performed at the Artist for the Arts Foundation benefit at Barnum Hall, Santa Monica High School, Santa Monica, California. Performing live, alongside Heart, Venice ("Crazy on You") and over 70 members of the Santa Monica High School (SaMoHi) Orchestra and Girls Choir ("Bohemian Rhapsody"), the benefit helped to provide funds for the continuation of music education in public schools. Browne again performed there with Heart and other musician guest stars in 2009.

In June 2008, Browne appeared alongside Noam Chomsky, Douglas Rushkoff, and 98 other musicians (and /or musical acts) in the film American Music: OFF THE RECORD; Dir. by Benjamin Meade of Cosmic Cowboy studio in Fayetteville, Arkansas and produced by Frank Hicks; owner of Knuckleheads in Kansas City, MO.

In September 2009, Browne joined artists such as Fred Tackett (Little Feat), Inara George (The Bird and the Bee) and others in supporting orphans, foster and homeless children through Safety Harbor Kids Holiday Collection with proceeds going to help educate at-risk youth.

In 2010, he recorded a version of "Waterloo Sunset" with Ray Davies for the latter's collaborations album, See My Friends.

In January 2011, Browne won the 10th Annual Independent Music Awards in the Best Live Performance Album category for Love Is Strange: En Vivo Con Tino, performed by himself and David Lindley.

Browne contributed a cover of Buddy Holly's "True Love Ways" for a 2011 tribute album, Listen to Me: Buddy Holly.

In 2012, he joined artists such as David Crosby and Pete Seeger in supporting Ben Cohen's Stamp Stampede campaign to legally stamp messages such as "Not to Be Used for Bribing Politicians" on American currency to build a movement to amend the constitution and get big money out of politics.

On April 1, 2014, a 23-song, two-disc set titled Looking into You: A Tribute to Jackson Browne was released. The album features covers of Browne's songs by such artists as Bruce Springsteen, Don Henley, Lyle Lovett and Bonnie Raitt.

On October 7, 2014, Browne's 14th studio album, titled Standing in the Breach, was released.

In January 2016, Browne endorsed Senator Bernie Sanders for President of the United States in the 2016 United States presidential election.

On February 15, 2016, at the 58th Annual Grammy Awards, Browne and the Eagles performed "Take It Easy" in honor of Glenn Frey, who had died the month before.

Browne plays himself and sings in episode 10 of the Showtime series Roadies.

In March 2020, Browne released "A Little Soon to Say" as the first single from his then-as-yet-untitled upcoming fifteenth album. The following month he released another single, "Downhill from Everywhere", which serves as the album's title track. Downhill from Everywhere was slated to be released on his 72nd birthday, October 9, 2020; however, its release was pushed back to July 23, 2021. A U.S. tour with James Taylor, which was supposed to take place in 2020, had also postponed due to the COVID-19 pandemic and was rescheduled to the summer of 2021. In March 2021, Browne collaborated with singer-songwriter Phoebe Bridgers for a new version of her song "Kyoto", released exclusively for Spotify.

Browne's fifteenth studio album, Downhill from Everywhere, was released July 23, 2021, by Inside Recordings.

Personal life

Browne has been married twice and has two children. His first wife was actress and model Phyllis Major. The two began their relationship around 1971. Their son, model and actor Ethan Zane Browne, was born in 1973 at Cedars-Sinai Medical Center and grew up in Los Angeles. Jackson and six-month-old Ethan appeared together on the cover of Rolling Stone magazine in May 1974. Ethan Browne has worked as a model and had small parts in two movies, Raising Helen and Hackers. Jackson Browne and Phyllis Major married in late 1975. Major died by suicide by consuming an overdose of barbiturates a few months later, in March 1976, at the age of 30.

In January 1981 Browne married Australian model Lynne Sweeney. Their son, Ryan Browne, born on January 28, 1982, has been a bass player and singer in the band Sonny and the Sunsets since 2007. Browne and Lynne Sweeney were divorced in 1983 when he began dating actress Daryl Hannah. The relationship ended in 1992. He has been with artist and environmental activist Dianna Cohen, a cofounding member of the Plastic Pollution Coalition, since the mid-1990s. He has one grandson.

Environmental activism
Browne was active in the anti-nuclear movement in the United States, and founded MUSE (Musicians United for Safe Energy) with Bonnie Raitt and John Hall in 1979. He was also an active member of the Abalone Alliance and the Alliance for Survival. According to environmental activist Ed Begley Jr., "He's got this big wind turbine, and his ranch is completely off the [power] grid", Begley said. "He's done all of it himself."

Browne campaigns against the unnecessary use of water in plastic bottles and takes steps to reduce usage on his tours. He is part of the movement "Plastic Free Backstage".

In April 2008, the Surf Industry Manufacturers Association gave Browne the honor of "Environmentalist of the Year".

Browne received the Duke LEAF Award for Lifetime Environmental Achievement in the Fine Arts in 2010 for his environmental activism and efforts to make his tours more "green".

Save Our Shores (SOS), an ocean-advocacy group in California, honored Browne with their Ocean Hero Award on February 23, 2011. SOS and mayor of Santa Cruz, California, Ryan Coonerty, proclaimed the date "Jackson Browne Day" in the City of Santa Cruz to honor Browne's social, environmental and antiplastic activism, and as a founding member of Plastic Pollution and an initiator of the REFUSE Disposable Plastics Campaign.

Browne also attended the TEDx Great Pacific Garbage Patch conference, performing a new song, "If I Could Be Anywhere", which laments mankind's destruction of the earth and giving hope to activism.

Charity
On November 8 and 9, 1992, Browne performed in Honolulu with Bonnie Raitt, Crosby, Stills & Nash and the Pahinui Brothers in a benefit concert for the victims of Hurricane Iniki which had devastated the island of Kauai two months earlier.

On October 25, 2014, Browne performed at the Arlington Theatre in Santa Barbara, California, in a benefit concert for Sanctuary Centers of Santa Barbara, a nonprofit providing mental health and co-occurring disorders treatment services. Jessie Bridges, Jeff Bridges and David Crosby also performed at this benefit. On August 11, 2015, he performed another benefit concert for Sanctuary Centers at the Santa Barbara Bowl.

In November 2013, Browne performed with students from School of Rock West LA and Burbank in a benefit concert for the Rock School Scholarship Fund, at the legendary Troubadour in West Hollywood. His set of hits including "Somebody's Baby", "Doctor My Eyes", and "Take It Easy" were all performed with students aged 13 to 17 accompanying him. Money raised went toward scholarships for children who want to attend any rock school in the USA but whose parents do not have the financial means.
 
In April 2012, Browne performed for Artists for the Arts benefit along with Glen Phillips of Toad the Wet Sprocket and the band Venice. The benefit was to keep arts and music in public schools funded and raised over $100,000. This was Browne's fifth appearance out of the nine annual shows that have taken place. The band Venice was the main act and performed all supporting music for the guest artists along with a student orchestra and choir from the Santa Monica High and Malibu High school districts. The concert, held at Barnum Hall, was a sold-out event.

In 2008, Browne contributed to the album Songs for Tibet, an initiative to support Dalai Lama Tenzin Gyatso, and to publicize the human rights situation in Tibet. The album was issued on August 5 via iTunes and on August 19 in music stores around the world.

Browne covered John Lennon's "Oh My Love" to benefit Amnesty International's campaign to alleviate the crisis in Darfur. The song appears on the album Instant Karma: The Amnesty International Campaign to Save Darfur, which was released on June 12, 2007, and features many other artists performing other John Lennon covers, such as R.E.M., Jack Johnson, U2, Avril Lavigne, Green Day, and The Black Eyed Peas.

Browne performed live and recorded The Beatles song medley "Golden Slumbers/Carry That Weight" in 1991 with Jennifer Warnes for the charity album For Our Children to benefit the Pediatrics AIDS Foundation. Browne and Warnes again performed it live for the Tucson, AZ, benefit concert.

Browne performed and sang the role of the Scarecrow in The Wizard of Oz in Concert: Dreams Come True, a 1995 musical performance for charity alongside Roger Daltrey, Natalie Cole, Nathan Lane, and other stars. The celebrity cast performed a reader's theatre and songs styled performance of the MGM film The Wizard of Oz at the Lincoln Center as a benefit for the Children's Defense Fund. VHS and CD recordings were released of the concert in 1996 by Rhino Records.

Browne covered Lowen & Navarro's "Weight of the World" on Keep The Light Alive: Celebrating The Music of Lowen & Navarro. The proceeds of the album benefit The Eric Lowen Trust, ALS Association Greater Los Angeles, and Augie's Quest.

Browne also held a benefit concert for the Rory David Deutsch Foundation which is dedicated to providing funding for brain tumor research and treatment.

In October 2010, Browne performed at both days of the 24th Annual Bridge School Benefit Concert, a yearly fundraiser established by Neil Young. The Bridge School assists children with severe physical impairments and complex communication needs. Browne also appeared at the 2010 NAMM Conference in Anaheim, California with Yoko Ono and Quincy Jones in support of the John Lennon Educational Tour Bus.

On March 10, 2011, Browne, David Crosby, Graham Nash, Alice Cooper, and others performed a benefit concert in Tucson, Arizona, benefiting The Fund For Civility, Respect, and Understanding, a foundation that raises awareness about and provides medical prevention and treatment services to people with mental disorders. The concert also benefited victims of the January 8, 2011, shootings in Tucson.

On July 23, 2013, Browne performed with the Kings of Leon and the Flaming Lips in Oklahoma City for Rock for Oklahoma, a benefit concert for Oklahoma tornado victims.

Browne has continued to provide exclusive music tracks for various charity and benefit albums, including Safety Harbor Kids Holiday Collection (where he sang the Johnny Marks holiday song "Silver and Gold" with longtime friend Lowell George's daughter, Inara George). Browne provided a live version of "Drums of War" for The People Speak Soundtrack. Other charity albums he has contributed to include: Acordes Con Leonard Cohen (song: "A Thousand Kisses Deep"), From Wharf Rats to Lords of the Docks Soundtrack (song: "Step By Step"), Shrink (the Kevin Spacey film soundtrack) (song: "Here"), Keep the Light Alive: Celebrating the Music of Eric Lowen and Dan Navarro (song: "Weight of the World"), and 1% for the Planet: The Music, Vol. 1 (a live version of "About My Imagination"), as well as many benefit concert and other appearances.

Awards and honors

Grammy Awards
The Grammy Awards are awarded annually by The Recording Academy of the United States for outstanding achievements in the music industry. Often considered the highest music honour, the awards were established in 1958. Browne has received seven nominations.

{| class="wikitable"
|-
! colspan="6" align="center"| Grammy Awards
|-
! Year
! style="width:375px;" | Work
! style="width:375px;" | Award
! width="65" | Result
! width="20" | Ref
|-
| rowspan="2"| 1979 
| rowspan="2"| Running on Empty
| Album of the Year
|  
| rowspan="7" align="center"|
|-
| Best Pop Vocal Performance, Male
| 
|-
| 1981
| "Boulevard"
| Best Rock Vocal Performance, Male 
|  
|-
| 1999
| "Kisses Sweeter than Wine" (with Bonnie Raitt)
| Best Pop Collaboration with Vocals
| 
|-
| 2007
| Solo Acoustic, Vol. 1
| rowspan="2"| Best Contemporary Folk Album
| 
|-
| 2011
| Love Is Strange: En Vivo Con Tino
| 
|-
| 2022
| Downhill from Everywhere 
| Best Americana Album
| 
|-

Other honors and recognitions
In 2002, Browne received the John Steinbeck Award, given to artists who exemplify the environmental and social values that Steinbeck believed in.

On March 14, 2004, Browne was inducted into the Rock and Roll Hall of Fame by Bruce Springsteen. On June 7, 2007, he was inducted into the Songwriters Hall of Fame.

In 2004, Browne was named an honorary Doctor of Music by Occidental College in Los Angeles for "a remarkable musical career that has successfully combined an intensely personal artistry with a broader vision of social justice." For "promoting peace and justice through his music and his unrelenting support for that which promotes nonviolent solutions to problems both nationally and internationally", Browne received the Courage of Conscience Awards from The Peace Abbey in Sherborn, Massachusetts.

In 2007, Browne was awarded the Chapin-World Hunger Year Harry Chapin Humanitarian Award.

In 2008, Browne received the NARM Harry Chapin Humanitarian Award.

In 2008, Browne received the Golden Plate Award of the American Academy of Achievement in recognition of his lifetime in the arts and dedication as a social activist. His award was presented by Awards Council member Senator Tom Daschle.

In 2018, Browne received the Gandhi Peace Award from the organization Promoting Enduring Peace. He is the first artist to receive the award.

Discography

 Jackson Browne (1972)
 For Everyman (1973)
 Late for the Sky (1974)
 The Pretender (1976)
 Running on Empty (1977)
 Hold Out (1980)
 Lawyers in Love (1983)
 Lives in the Balance (1986)
 World in Motion (1989)
 I'm Alive (1993)
 Looking East (1996)
 The Naked Ride Home (2002)
 Time the Conqueror (2008)
 Standing in the Breach (2014)
 Downhill from Everywhere (2021)

References

Bibliography

External links

 
 
 All Music Guide—Overview of Jackson Browne, including album reviews
 
 Wilson & Alroy's reviews of Jackson Browne recordings
 
 

 
1948 births
20th-century American guitarists
20th-century American pianists
20th-century American male musicians
21st-century American pianists
21st-century American male musicians
Activists from California
American baritones
American country guitarists
American country rock singers
American country singer-songwriters
American environmentalists
American expatriates in Germany
American folk guitarists
American folk rock musicians
American folk singers
American male guitarists
American male pianists
American male pop singers
American people of Norwegian descent
American pop rock singers
American rock guitarists
American rock pianists
Asylum Records artists
California Democrats
Country musicians from California
Elektra Records artists
Guitarists from Los Angeles
Living people
Nitty Gritty Dirt Band members
Slide guitarists
Singer-songwriters from California
American male singer-songwriters
Inside Recordings artists